Mark Brink Christensen (born 15 March 1998) is a Danish professional footballer who plays as a midfielder for Danish Superliga club Silkeborg IF.

Club career

Esbjerg fB
Born in Esbjerg, Denmark, Brink is a product of Esbjerg fB and has played for the club his entire youth career. He was the captain of the under-17 team and was promoted to the under-19 team at age 17. was promoted to the first team squad in the autumn of 2015 at the age of 17.

In March 2015, Brink won the Under-17 Talent of the Year 2015 award by the Danish Football Association. He made his debut on 1 October 2015 in Danish Cup match against amateur side, Søhus Stige BK, where Brink played the full ninety minutes in a 9–0 victory.

Brink made his league debut for Esbjerg on 4 April 2016 at the age of 18. Brink started on the pitch, but was replaced by Lasse Rise in the 62nd minute in a 1–0 victory against Viborg FF in the Danish Superliga. A few days later, he extended his contract until 2019.

After an individual successful period, his contract was extended once again in April 2017 until 2021.

On 25 July 2019, Brink made his European debut, starting in a 2–0 away loss to Belarusian club Shakhtyor Soligorsk in the second qualifying round of the UEFA Europa League.

Silkeborg
On transfer deadline day, 31 January 2020, Brink joined Silkeborg IF on a three-year contract. 

He made his competitive debut for the club on 16 February, replacing Vegard Moberg in the 84th minute of a 2–0 home loss to AaB. Silkeborg suffered relegation to the Danish 1st Division at the end of the 2019–20 season, bottom of the league.

On 11 September 2020, Brink scored his first goal for Silkeborg in the 92nd minute of a 4–2 away loss to FC Helsingør on the first matchday of the 2020–21 Danish 1st Division. Silkeborg bounced back to the Danish Superliga that season, finishing second in the league with Brink as a starter. He made 29 appearances, scoring the one goal.

With Brink as one of the key players in midfield, Silkeborg was one of the positive surprises of the 2021–22 season, impressing with an attacking and entertaining style of play under head coach Kent Nielsen. Due to the 2022 Russian invasion of Ukraine, all Russian teams were excluded from European tournaments by UEFA. This meant that the Danish Cup winners entered the final qualifying round for the UEFA Europa League. When FC Midtjylland won the 2021–22 Danish Cup, and at the same time finished in second place in the Superliga, which now gave access to UEFA Champions League qualification, Silkeborg secured Europa League qualification by virtue of their third-place Superliga finish. Brink finished the season with 34 appearances in which he scored one goal.

Career statistics

References

External links
 Mark Brink at Silkeborg IF 
 
 

1995 births
Living people
People from Esbjerg
Association football midfielders
Danish men's footballers
Danish Superliga players
Danish 1st Division players
Esbjerg fB players
Silkeborg IF players
Denmark youth international footballers
Sportspeople from the Region of Southern Denmark